Cyrtodactylus tahuna is a species of gecko that is endemic to Sangir Island in Indonesia.

References 

Cyrtodactylus
Reptiles described in 2018